Birdhana is a village in Jhajjar Mandal, Jhajjar District in Haryana, India.

Geography

Birdhana is 5.6 km distance from its Mandal Main Town Jhajjar and 230 km distance from its State Main City Chandigarh.

Nearby villages are Mehrana (2.4 km), Gudha (3.2 km), Jondhi *(3.7 km), Dujana (4 km), Chamanpura (4.3 km). Nearby towns are Jhajjar (5 km), Beri (9.8 km), Matannail (21 km), Bahadurgarh. (29.7 km).

Facilities in the village

The village has a co-educational public higher secondary school, a school for middle education and two different schools for boys and girls for primary education. There is a primary health center too in the village along with the a veterinary hospital for animals. There are eight Aanganwari Centers under the Child Development Scheme.

There are several temples and shrines with a long history: Temple of the Dadi satti is also there. Baba Haridas mandir is also a holy place in this Village. The temple of God Shiva in the village, situated on the bank of Maheshwar lake, is very famous among the locals where the fair is organised twice on the occasion of Shivratri, in which various activities are organised like Wrestling competition, kabaddi and other contests.

Demographics

Most of the population is of Dahiya Gotra which comes under the Jat community.
Farming is the main occupation.

References

External links 

Villages in Jhajjar district